Cavenagh Bridge is the only suspension bridge and one of the oldest bridges in Singapore, spanning the lower reaches of the Singapore River in the Downtown Core. Opened in 1869 to commemorate Singapore's new Crown colony of the Straits Settlements status in 1867, it is the oldest bridge in Singapore that exists in its original form.

History

Originally known as the Edinburgh Bridge to commemorate the visit of the Duke of Edinburgh, its name was changed to Cavenagh Bridge in honour of Major General Orfeur Cavenagh, the last India-appointed Governor of the Straits Settlements, who governed from 1859 to 1867. The coat of arms of the Cavenagh family can still be seen atop the signage at both ends of the bridge.

Cavenagh Bridge linked the Civic District on the northern bank to the Commercial District on the southern bank of the Singapore River. Before Cavenagh Bridge was constructed, people could only move between the two districts via a detour over Elgin Bridge or by paying 1 duit (¼ cent) for a boat ride across the river.

This bridge has elaborate suspension struts in comparison with most other suspension bridges, and is the third bridge to be built in Singapore. It was constructed in 1869 to allay the inconvenience of crossing the Singapore River by boat. Numerous steel rivets were used in its construction, which employed steel casting methods commonly used during that era.

The bridge was designed by the colonial Public Works Department's John Turnbull Thomson and constructed by the P&W Maclellan, Glasgow Engineers at a cost of Straits $80,000. Built and tested in Glasgow to withstand a load four times its own weight, it was shipped to Singapore in parts and reassembled in 1869 by convict labour before opening to traffic a year later. Rickshaws and ox carts used the Cavenagh Bridge to cross Singapore River. Subsequently, the bridge became overloaded due to the flourishing trade on the Singapore River in the late 1880s.

When Cavenagh Bridge became unable to cope with the increasing traffic into town and its low draught was insufficient for the passage of boats at high tide, the government decided to build the Anderson Bridge in 1910 to replace Cavenagh Bridge. Cavenagh Bridge was eventually spared from demolition and was converted to a pedestrian bridge, with the road traffic diverted to the Anderson Bridge. A police notice, which is still preserved until today, was thus erected at both ends of the bridge restricting the passage of vehicles that weighed beyond 3 cwt (152 kilograms or 336 pounds), including cattle and horses. The sign reads:
POLICE NOTICE
CAVENAGH BRIDGE

THE USE OF THIS BRIDGE IS PROHIBITED TO ANY VEHICLE OF WHICH THE LADEN WEIGHT EXCEEDS 3 CWT. AND TO ALL CATTLE AND HORSES

BY ORDER
CHIEF POLICE OFFICER.

Cavenagh Bridge today
Cavenagh Bridge is currently a pedestrian bridge, with lighting added in 1990 to accentuate its architectural features at nightfall. It now provides the most convenient pedestrian link between the cultural district at the north bank and the commercial district to the south of the Singapore River, and complements the renovated Fullerton Hotel (previously Fullerton Building) which is sited beside the bridge.

There are numerous sculpture works near the Cavenagh Bridge, including a family of Singapura cats (kucinta or drain cats), recognised as one of the smallest breeds of cats in the world, located at the southwest abutment.

On 3 November 2008, the bridge was selected for conservation as part of the Urban Redevelopment Authority's expanded conservation programme. It was subsequently upgraded to a national monument, planned in the early 2010s and announced in 2019 by Deputy Prime Minister Heng Swee Keat. The historical significance is the old police signboard and the physical bridge where Singaporeans had walked past through, even during Lee Kuan Yew's lying-in-state in March 2015.

See also

Chong Fah Cheong
List of bridges in Singapore
The Fullerton Hotel

References

Ilsa Sharp, (2005), The Journey - Singapore's Land Transport Story, SNP: Editions, 
Peter K G Dunlop (2000), Street Names of Singapore, Who's Who Publishing,

External links

Bridges completed in 1869
Downtown Core (Singapore)
Suspension bridges in Singapore
National monuments of Singapore
1869 establishments in the British Empire
19th-century architecture in Singapore